Marie Wilson (born Katherine Elizabeth Wilson; August 19, 1916 – November 23, 1972) was an American radio, film, and television actress. She may be best remembered as the title character in My Friend Irma.

Early life
Wilson was born in Anaheim, California, on August 19, 1916. Her nickname at Anaheim High School was "Maybelle". Wilson graduated from high school in 1933.

Career

Radio
Although Wilson was afraid of the microphone used in radio, she played scatterbrained Irma Peterson in the radio comedy My Friend Irma from April 11, 1947, to August 23, 1954.

Film
Wilson began her career in Hollywood in the 1934 film Down to Their Last Yacht as a ship passenger, and then appeared in Babes in Toyland as Mary Quite Contrary.  Wilson appeared in Ladies Crave Excitement (1935), The Girl Friend (1935), Stars Over Broadway (1935), Miss Pacific Fleet (1935), The Big Noise (1936), Melody for Two (1937), Boy Meets Girl (1938), Sweepstakes Winner (1939), Virginia (1941), She's in the Army (1942), You Can't Ration Love (1944), Young Widow (1946), and Never Wave at a WAC (1952).

In 1936, she played Miss Murgatroyd in Satan Met a Lady, a loose adaptation of the 1929 novel The Maltese Falcon by Dashiell Hammett. She was in The Great Garrick as Nicolle in 1937. Wilson was in Fools for Scandal as Myrtle in 1938. She was in Waterfront in 1939 as Ruby Waters.

In 1949, she played Irma Peterson in the film My Friend Irma, reprising her role from the radio series. In 1950, she again played Irma in My Friend Irma Goes West. In 1952, she played Jane Sweet in A Girl in Every Port, based on the short story They Sell Sailors Elephants by Frederick Hazlitt Brennan. In 1957, she played Marie Antoinette in The Story of Mankind, loosely based on the nonfiction book The Story of Mankind (1921) by Hendrik Willem van Loon. Wilson's last film was 1962's Mr. Hobbs Takes a Vacation, based on the novel by Edward Streeter.

Wilson also had roles in short films, including Bum Voyage (1934), Slide, Nellie, Slide (1936), Vitaphone Pictorial Revue (Series 2 No. 6) (1938), and Vitaphone Pictorial Revue (Series 2 No. 12).

Television
Wilson first appeared on television in the series My Friend Irma from 1952 to 1954. She was in two episodes of Burke's Law. Wilson was in the short-lived television series Where's Huddles?. Her last role was in 1972 as Margaret Cooperman in Love, American Style. Wilson was a guest on The Ed Sullivan Show on four occasions.

Stage
In June and July 1950, Wilson portrayed Lady Teazle in a production of School for Scandal at the Circle Theater in Hollywood. She appeared with her husband, Allan Nixon, who played Charles Surface. During February 1958 she starred as Cherie opposite Robert Gist as Bo in a production of Bus Stop at the Sombrero Playhouse in Phoenix, Arizona.

Walk of Fame
Wilson's talents have been recognized with three stars on the Hollywood Walk of Fame: for radio at 6301 Hollywood Boulevard, for television at 6765 Hollywood Boulevard, and for movies at 6601 Hollywood Boulevard.

Sculpture
Wilson's left leg was the model for a 35-ft (sometimes referred to as 34-ft), two-ton sculpture outside the Theme Hosiery (later Sanderson Hoisery) plant on Olympic and Barrington in West Los Angeles. The DuPont Co. commissioned the plaster leg, which was painted as if to be wearing nylons, to promote its new nylons product. Wilson was hoisted thigh-level at the sculpture's unveiling August 6, 1949.

Personal life
Wilson was married to actor Allan Nixon from 1942 to 1950. Her 1951 marriage to actor Robert Fallon lasted until her death from cancer at age 56. Wilson was interred in the Columbarium of Remembrance at Forest Lawn Cemetery in Hollywood Hills.

Filmography

Film

Film shorts/documentaries

Television

References

Notes

  Original publisher Alfred A. Knopf, Inc. in 1929.

Citations

Sources

External links

 
 Photographs and literature
 "Everybody’s Friend: Remembering Stan Lee and Dan DeCarlo’s 'My Friend Irma,'" Hogan's Alley #16, 2009
 

1916 births
1972 deaths
Actresses from Anaheim, California
American film actresses
American radio personalities
American radio actresses
American television actresses
Burials at Forest Lawn Memorial Park (Hollywood Hills)
Deaths from cancer in California
Actresses from California
20th-century American actresses